The 2001 Vaahteraliiga season was the 22nd season of the highest level of American football in Finland. The regular season took place between May 26 and August 5, 2001. The Finnish champion was determined in the playoffs and at the championship game Vaahteramalja XXII the Seinäjoki Crocodiles won the Helsinki Roosters.

Standings

Playoffs

References 

American football in Finland
Vaahteraliiga
Vaahteraliiga